The men's keirin at the 2012 UCI Track Cycling World Championships was held on 8 April. 33 athletes participated in the contest. After the six qualifying heats, the fastest rider in each heat advanced to the second round. The riders that did not advance to the second round, raced in six repechage heats. The first rider in each heat advanced to the second round along with the eight that qualified before.

The first three riders from each of the two second round heats advanced to the final and the remaining riders raced a consolation 7–12 final.

Medalists

Results

First round
The heats were held at 14:30.

Heat 1

Heat 2

Heat 3

Heat 4

Heat 5

Heat 6

First round repechage
The heats were held at 16:05.

Heat 1

Heat 2

Heat 3

Heat 4

Heat 5

Heat 6

Second round
The heats were held at 19:15.

Heat 1

Heat 2

Finals
The finals were held at 20:45.

Small final

Final

References

2012 UCI Track Cycling World Championships
UCI Track Cycling World Championships – Men's keirin